The Shenandoah Pin Rollers were a minor league baseball team based in Shenandoah, Iowa. Shenandoah first played as members of the Class D level 1903 Southwest Iowa League, winning the league championship in a shortened season. The Pin Rollers played in the Class D level Missouri-Iowa-Nebraska-Kansas League in 1910 and 1911. Shenandoah teams hosted home minor league games at Sportsman's Park.

History
The 1903 Shenandoah team was the first minor league baseball team Shenandoah, Iowa and won a partial league championship. Shenandoah briefly played as charter members of the 1903 six–team Class D level Southwest Iowa League. The Atlantic, Iowa, Clarinda, Creston Cyclones, Osceola, Iowa and Red Oak Blue Indians teams joined Shenandoah as charter members. Shenandoah was in 1st place with a record of 22–14 when the franchise folded on July 18, 1903 and the team had won the first half championship in the league. The manager was William Tiley. The 1903 Southwest Iowa League permanently folded after their only season of play.

In 1910, minor league baseball returned to Shenandoah. The Shenandoah "Pin Rollers" began play as charter members of the six–team, Class D level Missouri-Iowa-Nebraska-Kansas League, known informally as the "MINK League." Fellow charter members were the Falls City Colts, Clarinda Antelopes, Auburn Athletics, Maryville Comets and Nebraska City Forresters. 

Shenandoah's team "Pin Rollers" nickname corresponds to the city being a leader in the seed and industry in the era, with the pin rollers aiding in planting seeds. Shenandoah was known as the "Seed and Nursery Center of the World" and the Earl May Seed Company was founded in the city.
 
The Pin Rollers ended the 1910 season with a record of 47–52, placing third in the MINK league standings. The Pin Rollers finished 11.0 games behind the 1st place Falls City Colts, while playing the season under Manager E.C. Fishbaugh.  Playing home games at the Sportsman's Park, season attendance was 12,599, an average of 255 per home game.

The Shenandoah Pin Rollers played their final season in 1911. The Pin Rollers placed fourth in the Missouri-Illinois-Nebraska-Kansas League final standings with a 49–51 record, playing under manager Fred Wells. Shenandoah finished 10.0 games behind the 1st place Maryville Comets/Humboldt Infants team in the final standings. The Shenandoah Pin Rollers franchise folded from the MINK league after the season, along with the Clarinda Antelopes.

Shenandoah, Iowa has not hosted another minor league franchise.

The ballpark
Shenandoah teams hosted home minor league games at the Sportsman's Park. The 28–acre park is still in use today as a public park. The ballpark hosts Shenandoah High School baseball and softball teams. Sportsman's Park is located on Ferguson Road in the Northern section of Shenandoah, Iowa.

Timeline

Year–by–year records

Notable alumni
No alumni of Shenandoah teams advanced to the major leagues.

References

External links
Shenandoah - Baseball Reference

Defunct minor league baseball teams
Professional baseball teams in Iowa
Defunct baseball teams in Iowa
Baseball teams established in 1910
Baseball teams disestablished in 1911
1910 establishments in Iowa
Page County, Iowa
Fremont County, Iowa
Missouri-Iowa-Nebraska-Kansas League (minor league) teams